The 1895–96 French Rugby Union Championship was won by Olympique that defeated Stade Français in the final.

The tournament was played by five clubs from Paris: Racing, Stade français, Cosmopolitan Club, Olympique et Union Sportive de l'Est. The final pits the top two in the pool that had finished tied with six points.

Final

External links
 Compte rendu de la finale de 1896, sur lnr.fr

Notes and references 

1896
France
Championship